Englebert  may refer to any of the following:

Given name
Englebert Fisen (1655–1733), Flemish painter
Englebert Mollin (1904-?), Belgian wrestler
Englebert Opdebeeck (born 1946), Belgian cyclist

Surname
Gaëtan Englebert (born 1976), Belgian football midfielder
René Englebert, Belgian sport shooter

Other uses
Englebert (tyre manufacturer), Belgian tyre manufacturing company
Englebert Complex, a sports facility owned by the City of Dunedin, Florida, U.S.
TP Mazembe, formerly known as Englebert, a Congolese football club

See also 
Engelbert (disambiguation)